Victoria, officially the Municipality of Victoria,  is a 4th class municipality in the province of Laguna, Philippines. According to the 2020 census, it has a population of 43,408 people.

It is bordered by the Municipality of Calauan to the south-west, Nagcarlan to the southeast and Pila to the north-east. The municipality has a total land area of 22.83 square kilometers which is 1.30% of the total land area of the province of Laguna.

Duck Raising Capital of the Philippines, or Victoria, is a municipality offering some of the most bizarre yet delicious dishes including goats’ and ducks’ meat. The town is bordered by Calauan, Nagcarlan, and Pila. Following the town's nickname, the Itik Festival is celebrated, along with the town's founding anniversary, to give honor and to know more about the products that come from itik (duck)

History
Prominent citizens and civic leaders find new hope to make Nanhaya a town, when the Americans granted the Philippine Independence in 1946. They revived the move to separate from Pila. This time citizens proposed to name the town Trinidad, after the young republic's First Lady, the wife of then President Manuel Roxas. Strong oppositions shelved the proposal once more.

After Roxas's death, Elpidio Quirino took over the presidency. Nanhaya's residents remained undaunted. They tried once more, intensifying the campaign. Most prominent and wealthiest family of the town is the Fernandez clans, Judge Jose Fernandez, then Mayor Alejandro Fernandez, Atty. Ramon H. Fernandez Sr., Andres Franco, Dr. Agrifino Oca, Gregorio Herradura, and Leonardo Rebong stood for the proposal. Victoria was a barrio of Pila until November 15, 1949, when President Elpidio Quirino signed into effect EO 282 segregating this barrio and 8 others into an independent community. 

Its name, which means "Victory" in  Spanish, was adopted from President Quirino's daughter Victoria Quirino.

After Pateros became highly urbanized and densely populated, Victoria became a destination of balut traders and became the "Duck Raising Center of the Philippines". The town was featured as the detour challenge of Leg 11 of the 5th Season of The Amazing Race. Victoria celebrates the Itik Festival every second week of November.

The capital of Pila was once in Barangay Pagalangan, now one of Victoria's barangays.  What remains of Pila's original parish church can still be found in Pagalangan, which in the past made that community a target of treasure hunters seeking antiques.  Pagalangan ceased to be Pila's capital when the town center was moved due to frequent flooding.

Barangays
Victoria is politically subdivided into 9 barangays. Two of these, Nanhaya and San Roque, are classified as urban while the rest are rural.
 Banca-banca
 Daniw
 Masapang
 Nanhaya (Poblacion)
 Pagalangan
 San Benito
 San Felix
 San Francisco
 San Roque (Poblacion)

Demographics

Economy

Government

Elected officials
Municipal council (2022-2025):
 Mayor: Dwight C. Kampitan (NP) 
 Vice Mayor: RJ Kampitan (NP)
 Councilors:
 Florencio M. Laraño (NP)
 Wilfredo Herradura (PDP-LABAN)
 Ma. Fe B. Tope (PDP-LABAN)
 Homer Herradura (NP)
 Sonny Lazaro (PDP-LABAN)
 Analyn Nava (IND)
 Jhon Paul D. Pahutan (AKSYON)
 Joselito D. Corcuera (PDP-LABAN)
 LNB President: Leoncio S. Fajardo
 SK President: John Patrick S. Cambe
 SB Secretary: Caylene T. Fernandez

References

External links

[ Philippine Standard Geographic Code]
Philippine Census Information
Local Governance Performance Management System
History of Pila: A Secular and Spiritual History of the Town 900 A.D. to Present

Municipalities of Laguna (province)
Populated places on Laguna de Bay